Paul Edison Minner (July 30, 1923 – March 28, 2006), was a Major League pitcher from 1946 to 1956. He played for the Chicago Cubs and Brooklyn Dodgers.

Minner was signed by the Dodgers and began minor league play in 1941, but service as a master sergeant in the United States Army during World War II interrupted his baseball career from 1943 through 1945.

Minner surrendered the first home run in Frank Robinson's career on April 28, 1956. It was the first of Robinson's 586 career home runs, seventh all-time.

Minner was a better than average hitting pitcher in his major league career, posting a .219 batting average (98-for-447) with 46 runs, 6 home runs, 43 RBI and 33 bases on balls. He finished his career with a .967 fielding percentage.

Minner died March 28, 2006, in Lemoyne, Pennsylvania, aged 82.

References

External links

Baseball in Wartime – Those Who Served A to Z

1923 births
2006 deaths
Major League Baseball pitchers
Baseball players from Pennsylvania
Chicago Cubs players
Brooklyn Dodgers players
Thomasville Lookouts players
Knoxville Smokies players
Elizabethton Betsy Red Sox players
Mobile Bears players
Montreal Royals players
People from Lawrence County, Pennsylvania
United States Army personnel of World War II